Inga fervida is a moth in the family Oecophoridae. It was described by Zeller in 1855. It is found in Brazil.

References

Moths described in 1855
Inga (moth)